is a village in the administrative district of Gmina Bolesławiec, within Bolesławiec County, Lower Silesian Voivodeship, in south-western Poland. Prior to 1945 it was in Germany and until then the official German place name was Looswitz.

The village has a population of 560.

References

Villages in Bolesławiec County